Rahat (Arabic: رهط, Hebrew: רַהַט), a predominantly Bedouin city in the Southern District of Israel.

Rahat (confectionery), an alternative name of Turkish delight in many languages

People
Rahat Afza, Pakistani politician, member of the Provincial Assembly of the Punjab
Rahat Ali (cricketer) (born 1988), Pakistani cricketer
Rahat Amanullah, Pakistani politician, member of the National Assembly of Pakistan 
Rahat Indori (born 1950), Indian Bollywood lyricist and Urdu language poet
Rahat Jamali (born 1965), Pakistani politician, member of the Provincial Assembly of Balochistan
Rahat Kazmi, Pakistani actor, anchorman and speaker and academician
Rahat Khan (born 1940), Bangladeshi journalist and litterateur
Rahat Khan (field hockey), Pakistani field hockey player and league official
Rahat Fateh Ali Khan (born 1974), Pakistani musician, primarily of Qawwali, a devotional music of the Muslim Sufis
Rahat Zakheli (born 1884), Pashto poet, author and publisher

Music
DJ Rahat or Rahat Hayat, Bangladeshi DJ

See also
Harrat Rahat, a volcanic lava field in the Hejazi region of Saudi Arabia
Operation Rahat, the name given to the Indian Air Force's rescue operations to evacuate civilians affected by the 2013 North India floods
PNS Rahat Hospital, a Pakistan Naval hospital